Nai Duniya Naye Log is a 1973 Bollywood drama film directed by B.R.Ishara. The film stars Reena Roy and Danny Denzongpa in their first film roles.

Cast
Reena Roy ...  Sandhya 
Satyen   
Danny Denzongpa   
Manmohan Krishna   
Nadira

Songs
"Ae Pyar Mujhe Ro Lene De, Meri Palko Ke Kinare Jalte Hai" - Suman Kalyanpur, Mukesh
"Mujhe Teri Baaho Me, Na Jaane Kya Milta Hai" - Asha Bhosle
"Do Hoonth Hile Ek Geet Suna" - Mukesh
"Love Can Fly" - Ursula Vaz

External links
 

1973 films
1970s Hindi-language films
1973 drama films
Films scored by Sapan-Jagmohan
Films directed by B. R. Ishara